The Semitic languages are a branch of the Afroasiatic language family. They are spoken by more than 330 million people across much of West Asia, the Horn of Africa, and latterly North Africa, Malta, West Africa, Chad, and in large immigrant and expatriate communities in North America, Europe, and Australasia. The terminology was first used in the 1780s by members of the Göttingen school of history, who derived the name from Shem, one of the three sons of Noah in the Book of Genesis.

Semitic languages occur in written form from a very early historical date in West Asia, with East Semitic Akkadian and Eblaite texts (written in a script adapted from Sumerian cuneiform) appearing from the 30th century BCE and the 25th century BCE in Mesopotamia and the north eastern Levant respectively. The only earlier attested languages are Sumerian and Elamite (2800 BCE to 550 BCE), both language isolates, and Egyptian (a sister branch of the Afroasiatic family, related to the Semitic languages but not part of them). Amorite appeared in Mesopotamia and the northern Levant circa 2000 BC, followed by the mutually intelligible Canaanite languages (including Hebrew, Phoenician, Moabite, Edomite and Ammonite, and perhaps Ekronite, Amalekite and Sutean), the still spoken Aramaic, and Ugaritic during the 2nd millennium BC.

Most scripts used to write Semitic languages are abjadsa type of alphabetic script that omits some or all of the vowels, which is feasible for these languages because the consonants are the primary carriers of meaning in the Semitic languages. These include the Ugaritic, Phoenician, Aramaic, Hebrew, Syriac, Arabic, and ancient South Arabian alphabets. The Geʽez script, used for writing the Semitic languages of Ethiopia and Eritrea, is technically an abugida a modified abjad in which vowels are notated using diacritic marks added to the consonants at all times, in contrast with other Semitic languages which indicate vowels based on need or for introductory purposes. Maltese is the only Semitic language written in the Latin script and the only Semitic language to be an official language of the European Union.

The Semitic languages are notable for their nonconcatenative morphology. That is, word roots are not themselves syllables or words, but instead are isolated sets of consonants (usually three, making a so-called triliteral root). Words are composed out of roots not so much by adding prefixes or suffixes, but rather by filling in the vowels between the root consonants, although prefixes and suffixes are often added as well. For example, in Arabic, the root meaning "write" has the form k-t-b. From this root, words are formed by filling in the vowels and sometimes adding consonants, e.g. كتاب kitāb "book", كتب kutub "books", كاتب kātib "writer", كتّاب kuttāb "writers", كتب kataba "he wrote", يكتب yaktubu "he writes", etc.

Name and identification

The similarity of the Hebrew, Arabic and Aramaic languages has been accepted by all scholars since medieval times. The languages were familiar to Western European scholars due to historical contact with neighbouring Near Eastern countries and through Biblical studies, and a comparative analysis of Hebrew, Arabic, and Aramaic was published in Latin in 1538 by Guillaume Postel. Almost two centuries later, Hiob Ludolf described the similarities between these three languages and the Ethiopian Semitic languages. However, neither scholar named this grouping as "Semitic".

The term "Semitic" was created by members of the Göttingen School of History, initially by August Ludwig von Schlözer (1781), to designate the languages closely related to Arabic, Aramaic, and Hebrew. The choice of name was derived from Shem, one of the three sons of Noah in the genealogical accounts of the biblical Book of Genesis, or more precisely from the Koine Greek rendering of the name, .  Johann Gottfried Eichhorn is credited with popularising the term, particularly via a 1795 article "Semitische Sprachen" (Semitic languages) in which he justified the terminology against criticism that Hebrew and Canaanite were the same language despite Canaan being "Hamitic" in the Table of Nations:

Previously these languages had been commonly known as the "" in European literature. In the 19th century, "Semitic" became the conventional name; however, an alternative name, "", was later introduced by James Cowles Prichard and used by some writers.

History

Ancient Semitic-speaking peoples

Semitic languages were spoken and written across much of the Middle East and Asia Minor during the Bronze Age and Iron Age, the earliest attested being the East Semitic Akkadian of Mesopotamia (Akkad, Assyria, Isin, Larsa and Babylonia) from the third millennium BC.

The origin of Semitic-speaking peoples is still under discussion. Several locations were proposed as possible sites of a prehistoric origin of Semitic-speaking peoples: Mesopotamia, the Levant, Ethiopia the Eastern Mediterranean region, the Arabian Peninsula, and North Africa. Some claim that the Semitic languages originated in the Levant around 3800 BC, and were introduced to the Horn of Africa at about 800 BC from the southern Arabian peninsula, and to North Africa via Phoenician colonists at approximately the same time. Others assign the arrival of Semitic speakers in the Horn of Africa to a much earlier date according to theory believed by many scholars now  Semitic originated from an offshoot of a still earlier language in North Africa and desertization made its inhabitants to migrate in the fourth millennium BC into what is now Ethiopia, others northwest out of Africa into West Asia

The various extremely closely related and mutually intelligible Canaanite languages, a branch of the Northwest Semitic languages included Amorite, first attested in the 21st century BC, Edomite, Hebrew, Ammonite, Moabite, Phoenician (Punic/Carthaginian), Samaritan Hebrew, Ekronite, Amalekite and Sutean. They were spoken in what is today Israel, Syria, Lebanon, the Palestinian territories, Jordan, the northern Sinai peninsula, some northern and eastern parts of the Arabian peninsula, southwest fringes of Turkey, and in the case of Phoenician, coastal regions of Tunisia (Carthage), Libya, Algeria and parts of Morocco, Spain and possibly in Malta and other Mediterranean islands. Ugaritic, a Northwest Semitic language closely related to but distinct from the Canaanite group was spoken in the kingdom of Ugarit in north western Syria.

A hybrid Canaano-Akkadian language also emerged in Canaan (Israel, Jordan, Lebanon) during the 14th century BC, incorporating elements of the Mesopotamian East Semitic Akkadian language of Assyria and Babylonia with the West Semitic Canaanite languages.

Aramaic, a still living ancient Northwest Semitic language, first attested in the 12th century BC in the northern Levant, gradually replaced the East Semitic and Canaanite languages across much of the Near East, particularly after being adopted as the lingua franca of the vast Neo-Assyrian Empire (911–605 BC) by Tiglath-Pileser III during the 8th century BC, and being retained by the succeeding Neo-Babylonian and Achaemenid Empires.

The Chaldean language (not to be confused with Aramaic or its Biblical variant, sometimes referred to as Chaldean) was a Northwest Semitic language, possibly closely related to Aramaic, but no examples of the language remain, as after settling in south eastern Mesopotamia from the Levant during the 9th century BC, the Chaldeans appear to have rapidly adopted the Akkadian and Aramaic languages of the indigenous Mesopotamians.

Old South Arabian languages (classified as South Semitic and therefore distinct from the Central-Semitic Arabic) were spoken in the kingdoms of Dilmun, Meluhha, Sheba, Ubar, Socotra and Magan, which in modern terms encompassed part of the eastern coast of Saudi Arabia, and Bahrain, Qatar, Oman and Yemen. South Semitic languages are thought to have spread to the Horn of Africa circa 8th century BC where the Ge'ez language emerged (though the direction of influence remains uncertain).

Common Era

The Akkadian-influenced Syriac, a 5th-century BC Mesopotamian (Assyrian) descendant of Aramaic used in Mesopotamia, northeastern  Syria, and south east Anatolia, rose to importance as a literary language of early Christianity in the third to fifth centuries and continued into the early Islamic era.

The Arabic language, although originating in the Arabian Peninsula, first emerged in written form in the 1st to 4th centuries CE in the southern regions of The Levant. With the advent of the early Arab conquests of the seventh and eighth centuries, Classical Arabic eventually replaced many (but not all) of the indigenous Semitic languages and cultures of the Near East. Both the Near East and North Africa saw an influx of Muslim Arabs from the Arabian Peninsula, followed later by non-Semitic Muslim Iranian and Turkic peoples. The previously dominant Aramaic dialects maintained by the Assyrians, Babylonians and Persians gradually began to be sidelined, however descendant dialects of Eastern Aramaic (including the Akkadian influenced Assyrian Neo-Aramaic, Chaldean Neo-Aramaic, Turoyo and Mandaic) survive to this day among the Assyrians and Mandaeans of northern and southern Iraq, northwestern Iran, northeastern Syria and southeastern Turkey, with up to a million fluent speakers. Eastern Aramaic is a recognized language in Iraq, furthermore, Mesopotamian Arabic is the most Aramaic-Syriac influenced dialect of Arabic, due to Aramaic-Syriac having originated in Mesopotamia. Meanwhile Western Aramaic is now only spoken by a few thousand Aramean Syriac Christians in western Syria. The Arabs spread their Central Semitic language to North Africa (Egypt, Libya, Tunisia, Algeria, Morocco and northern Sudan and Mauritania),  where it gradually replaced Egyptian Coptic and many Berber languages (although Berber is still largely extant in many areas), and for a time to the Iberian Peninsula (modern Spain, Portugal and Gibraltar) and Malta.

With the patronage of the caliphs and the prestige of its liturgical status, Arabic rapidly became one of the world's main literary languages. Its spread among the masses took much longer, however, as many (although not all) of the native populations outside the Arabian Peninsula only gradually abandoned their languages in favour of Arabic. As Bedouin tribes settled in conquered areas, it became the main language of not only central Arabia, but also Yemen, the Fertile Crescent, and Egypt. Most of the Maghreb followed, specifically in the wake of the Banu Hilal's incursion in the 11th century, and Arabic became the native language of many inhabitants of al-Andalus. After the collapse of the Nubian kingdom of Dongola in the 14th century, Arabic began to spread south of Egypt into modern Sudan; soon after, the Beni Ḥassān brought Arabization to Mauritania. A number of Modern South Arabian languages distinct from Arabic still survive, such as Soqotri, Mehri and Shehri which are mainly spoken in Socotra, Yemen and Oman.

Meanwhile, the Semitic languages that had arrived from southern Arabia in the 8th century BC were diversifying in Ethiopia and Eritrea, where, under heavy Cushitic influence, they split into a number of languages, including Amharic and Tigrinya. With the expansion of Ethiopia under the Solomonic dynasty, Amharic, previously a minor local language, spread throughout much of the country, replacing both Semitic (such as Gafat) and non-Semitic (such as Weyto) languages, and replacing Ge'ez as the principal literary language (though Ge'ez remains the liturgical language for Christians in the region); this spread continues to this day, with Qimant set to disappear in another generation.

Present situation

Arabic is currently the native language of majorities from Mauritania to Oman, and from Iraq to the Sudan. Classical Arabic is the language of the Quran. It is also studied widely in the non-Arabic-speaking Muslim world. The Maltese language is genetically a descendant of the extinct Siculo-Arabic, a variety of Maghrebi Arabic formerly spoken in Sicily. The modern Maltese alphabet is based on the Latin script with the addition of some letters with diacritic marks and digraphs. Maltese is the only Semitic official language within the European Union.

Successful as second languages far beyond their numbers of contemporary first-language speakers, a few Semitic languages today are the base of the sacred literature of some of the world's major religions, including Islam (Arabic), Judaism (Hebrew and Aramaic), churches of Syriac Christianity (Syriac) and Ethiopian and Eritrean Orthodox Christianity (Ge'ez). Millions learn these as a second language (or an archaic version of their modern tongues): many Muslims learn to read and recite the Qur'an and Jews speak and study Biblical Hebrew, the language of the Torah, Midrash, and other Jewish scriptures. Ethnic Assyrian followers of the Assyrian Church of the East, Chaldean Catholic Church, Ancient Church of the East, Assyrian Pentecostal Church, Assyrian Evangelical Church and Assyrian members of the Syriac Orthodox Church both speak Mesopotamian eastern Aramaic and use it also as a liturgical tongue. The language is also used liturgically by the primarily Arabic-speaking followers of the Maronite, Syriac Catholic Church and some Melkite Christians. Greek and Arabic are the main liturgical languages of Oriental Orthodox Christians in the Middle East, who compose the patriarchates of Antioch, Jerusalem and Alexandria. Mandaic is both spoken and used as a liturgical language by the Mandaeans.

Despite the ascendancy of Arabic in the Middle East, other Semitic languages still exist. Biblical Hebrew, long extinct as a colloquial language and in use only in Jewish literary, intellectual, and liturgical activity, was revived in spoken form at the end of the 19th century. Modern Hebrew is the main language of Israel, with Biblical Hebrew remaining as the language of liturgy and religious scholarship of Jews worldwide.

Ethnic groups, in particular the Assyrians, Kurdish Jews, and Gnostic Mandeans, continue to speak and write Mesopotamian Aramaic languages, particularly Neo-Aramaic languages descended from Syriac, in those areas roughly corresponding to Kurdistan (northern Iraq, northeast Syria, south eastern Turkey and northwestern Iran). Syriac language itself, a descendant of Eastern Aramaic languages (Mesopotamian Old Aramaic), is used also liturgically by the Syriac Christians throughout the area. Although the majority of Neo-Aramaic dialects spoken today are descended from Eastern varieties, Western Neo-Aramaic is still spoken in 3 villages in Syria.

In Arab-dominated Yemen and Oman, on the southern rim of the Arabian Peninsula, a few tribes continue to speak Modern South Arabian languages such as Mahri and Soqotri. These languages differ greatly from both the surrounding Arabic dialects and from the (unrelated but previously thought to be related) languages of the Old South Arabian inscriptions.

Historically linked to the peninsular homeland of Old South Arabian, of which only one language, Razihi, remains, Ethiopia and Eritrea contain a substantial number of Semitic languages; the most widely spoken are Amharic in Ethiopia, Tigre in Eritrea, and Tigrinya in both. Amharic is the official language of Ethiopia. Tigrinya is a working language in Eritrea. Tigre is spoken by over one million people in the northern and central Eritrean lowlands and parts of eastern Sudan. A number of Gurage languages are spoken by populations in the semi-mountainous region of central Ethiopia, while Harari is restricted to the city of Harar. Ge'ez remains the liturgical language for certain groups of Christians in Ethiopia and in Eritrea.

Phonology
The phonologies of the attested Semitic languages are presented here from a comparative point of view. See Proto-Semitic language#Phonology for details on the phonological reconstruction of Proto-Semitic used in this article.

This comparative approach is natural for the consonants, as sound correspondences among the consonants of the Semitic languages are very straightforward for a family of its time depth. Sound shifts affecting the vowels are more numerous and, at times, less regular.

Consonants
Each Proto-Semitic phoneme was reconstructed to explain a certain regular sound correspondence between various Semitic languages. Note that Latin letter values (italicized) for extinct languages are a question of transcription; the exact pronunciation is not recorded.

Most of the attested languages have merged a number of the reconstructed original fricatives, though South Arabian retains all fourteen (and has added a fifteenth from *p > f).

In Aramaic and Hebrew, all non-emphatic stops occurring singly after a vowel were softened to fricatives, leading to an alternation that was often later phonemicized as a result of the loss of gemination.

In languages exhibiting pharyngealization of emphatics, the original velar emphatic has rather developed to a uvular stop .

Note: the fricatives *s, *z, *ṣ, *ś, *ṣ́, *ṱ may also be interpreted as affricates (/t͡s/, /d͡z/, /t͡sʼ/, /t͡ɬ/, /t͡ɬʼ/, /t͡θʼ/).
Notes:
In both of these cases, however, the two sounds represented by the same letter eventually merged, leaving no evidence (other than early transcriptions) of the former distinctions.
(Also note that due to begadkefat spirantization, which occurred after this merger, OAm. t > ṯ and d > ḏ in some positions, so that PS *t,ṯ and *d, ḏ may be realized as either of t, ṯ and d, ḏ respectively.) This suggests that these sounds, too, were distinguished in Old Aramaic language, but written using the same letters as they later merged with.
 The earlier pharyngeals can be distinguished in Akkadian from the zero reflexes of *ḥ, *ʕ by e-coloring adjacent *a, e.g. pS *ˈbaʕal-um 'owner, lord' > Akk. bēlu(m).
 Hebrew and Aramaic underwent begadkefat spirantization at a certain point, whereby the stop sounds  were softened to the corresponding fricatives  (written ḇ ḡ ḏ ḵ p̄ ṯ) when occurring after a vowel and not geminated. This change probably happened after the original Old Aramaic phonemes  disappeared in the 7th century BCE, and most likely occurred after the loss of Hebrew  c. 200 BCE. It is known to have occurred in Hebrew by the 2nd century CE. After a certain point this alternation became contrastive in word-medial and final position (though bearing low functional load), but in word-initial position they remained allophonic. In Modern Hebrew, the distinction has a higher functional load due to the loss of gemination, although only the three fricatives  are still preserved (the fricative  is pronounced  in modern Hebrew). 
 In the Northwest Semitic languages,  became  at the beginning of a word, e.g. Hebrew yeled "boy" < *wald (cf. Arabic walad).
 There is evidence of a rule of assimilation of /j/ to the following coronal consonant in pre-tonic position, shared by Hebrew, Phoenician and Aramaic.
 In Assyrian Neo-Aramaic,  is nonexistent. In general cases, the language would lack pharyngeal fricative  (as heard in Ayin). However, /ʕ/ is retained in educational speech, especially among Assyrian priests.
 Ugaritic orthography indicated the vowel after the glottal stop.
In addition to other minor allophones.
The Arabic letter  has three main pronunciations in spoken varieties.  in most of the Arabian Peninsula, Northern and Eastern Yemen and parts of Oman, Southern Iraq, Upper Egypt, Sudan, Libya, some parts of the Levant and to lesser extent in some parts (mostly rural) of Maghreb.  in most of Tunisia, Algeria and Morocco, Southern and Western Yemen and parts of Oman, Northern Iraq, parts of the Levant especially Druze dialects.  in most of the Levant and Lower Egypt, as well as some North African towns such as Tlemcen and Fez. In addition to other minor allophones.
 can be written , and always is in the Ugaritic and Arabic contexts.
Early Amharic might have had a different phonology.
The pronunciations /ʕ/ and /ħ/ for ʿAyin and Ḥet, respectively, still occur among some older Mizrahi speakers, but for most modern Israelis, ʿAyin and Ḥet are realized as /ʔ, -/ and /χ ~ x/, respectively.

The following table shows the development of the various fricatives in Hebrew, Aramaic, Arabic and Maltese through cognate words:

 possibly affricated (/dz/ /tɬʼ/ /ʦʼ/ /tθʼ/ /tɬ/)

Vowels

Proto-Semitic vowels are, in general, harder to deduce due to the nonconcatenative morphology of Semitic languages. The history of vowel changes in the languages makes drawing up a complete table of correspondences impossible, so only the most common reflexes can be given:

 in a stressed open syllable
 in a stressed closed syllable before a geminate
 in a stressed closed syllable before a consonant cluster
 when the proto-Semitic stressed vowel remained stressed
 pS *a,*ā > Akk. e,ē in the neighborhood of pS *ʕ,*ħ and before r.
 i.e. pS *g,*k,*ḳ,*χ > Ge'ez gʷ, kʷ,ḳʷ,χʷ / _u

Grammar
The Semitic languages share a number of grammatical features, although variation — both between separate languages, and within the languages themselves — has naturally occurred over time.

Word order
The reconstructed default word order in Proto-Semitic is verb–subject–object (VSO), possessed–possessor (NG), and noun–adjective (NA). This was still the case in Classical Arabic and Biblical Hebrew, e.g. Classical Arabic رأى محمد فريدا ra'ā muħammadun farīdan. (literally "saw Muhammad Farid", Muhammad saw Farid). In the modern Arabic vernaculars, however, as well as sometimes in Modern Standard Arabic (the modern literary language based on Classical Arabic) and Modern Hebrew, the classical VSO order has given way to SVO. Modern Ethiopian Semitic languages follow a different word order: SOV, possessor–possessed, and adjective–noun; however, the oldest attested Ethiopian Semitic language, Ge'ez, was VSO, possessed–possessor, and noun–adjective. Akkadian was also predominantly SOV.

Cases in nouns and adjectives
The proto-Semitic three-case system (nominative, accusative and genitive) with differing vowel endings (-u, -a -i), fully preserved in Qur'anic Arabic (see ʾIʿrab), Akkadian and Ugaritic, has disappeared everywhere in the many colloquial forms of Semitic languages. Modern Standard Arabic maintains such case distinctions, although they are typically lost in free speech due to colloquial influence. An accusative ending -n is preserved in Ethiopian Semitic. In the northwest, the scarcely attested Samalian reflects a case distinction in the plural between nominative -ū and oblique -ī (compare the same distinction in Classical Arabic). Additionally, Semitic nouns and adjectives had a category of state, the indefinite state being expressed by nunation.

Number in nouns
Semitic languages originally had three grammatical numbers: singular, dual, and plural. Classical Arabic still has a mandatory dual (i.e. it must be used in all circumstances when referring to two entities), marked on nouns, verbs, adjectives and pronouns. Many contemporary dialects of Arabic still have a dual, as in the name for the nation of Bahrain (baħr "sea" + -ayn "two"), although it is marked only on nouns. It also occurs in Hebrew in a few nouns (šana means "one year", šnatayim means "two years", and šanim means "years"), but for those it is obligatory. The curious phenomenon of broken plurals – e.g. in Arabic, sadd "one dam" vs. sudūd "dams" found most profusely in the languages of Arabia and Ethiopia, may be partly of proto-Semitic origin, and partly elaborated from simpler origins.

Verb aspect and tense

All Semitic languages show two quite distinct styles of morphology used for conjugating verbs. Suffix conjugations take suffixes indicating the person, number and gender of the subject, which bear some resemblance to the pronominal suffixes used to indicate direct objects on verbs ("I saw him") and possession on nouns ("his dog"). So-called prefix conjugations actually takes both prefixes and suffixes, with the prefixes primarily indicating person (and sometimes number or gender), while the suffixes (which are completely different from those used in the suffix conjugation) indicate number and gender whenever the prefix does not mark this. The prefix conjugation is noted for a particular pattern of  prefixes where (1) a t- prefix is used in the singular to mark the second person and third-person feminine, while a y- prefix marks the third-person masculine; and (2) identical words are used for second-person masculine and third-person feminine singular. The prefix conjugation is extremely old, with clear analogues in nearly all the families of Afroasiatic languages (i.e. at least 10,000 years old). The table on the right shows examples of the prefix and suffix conjugations in Classical Arabic, which has forms that are close to Proto-Semitic.

In Proto-Semitic, as still largely reflected in East Semitic, prefix conjugations are used both for the past and the non-past, with different vocalizations. Cf. Akkadian niprus "we decided" (preterite), niptaras "we have decided" (perfect), niparras "we decide" (non-past or imperfect), vs. suffix-conjugated parsānu "we are/were/will be deciding" (stative). Some of these features, e.g. gemination indicating the non-past/imperfect, are generally attributed to Afroasiatic. Proto-Semitic had an additional form, the jussive, which was distinguished from the preterite only by the position of stress: the jussive had final stress while the preterite had non-final (retracted) stress.

The West Semitic languages significantly reshaped the system. The most substantial changes occurred in the Central Semitic languages (the ancestors of modern Hebrew, Arabic and Aramaic). Essentially, the old prefix-conjugated jussive or preterite became a new non-past (or imperfect), while the stative became a new past (or perfect), and the old prefix-conjugated non-past (or imperfect) with gemination was discarded. New suffixes were used to mark different moods in the non-past, e.g. Classical Arabic -u (indicative), -a (subjunctive), vs no suffix (jussive). (It is not generally agreed whether the systems of the various Semitic languages are better interpreted in terms of tense, i.e. past vs. non-past, or aspect, i.e. perfect vs. imperfect.) A special feature in classical Hebrew is the waw-consecutive, prefixing a verb form with the letter waw in order to change its tense or aspect. The South Semitic languages show a system somewhere between the East and Central Semitic languages.

Later languages show further developments. In the modern varieties of Arabic, for example, the old mood suffixes were dropped, and new mood prefixes developed (e.g. bi- for indicative vs. no prefix for subjunctive in many varieties). In the extreme case of Neo-Aramaic, the verb conjugations have been entirely reworked under Iranian influence.

Morphology: triliteral roots

All Semitic languages exhibit a unique pattern of stems called Semitic roots consisting typically of triliteral, or three-consonant consonantal roots (two- and four-consonant roots also exist), from which nouns, adjectives, and verbs are formed in various ways (e.g., by inserting vowels, doubling consonants, lengthening vowels or by adding prefixes, suffixes, or infixes).

For instance, the root k-t-b, (dealing with "writing" generally) yields in Arabic:

katabtu كَتَبْتُ or كتبت "I wrote" (f and m)
yuktab(u) يُكْتَبُ or يكتب "being written" (masculine)
tuktab(u) تُكتَبُ or تكتب "being written" (feminine)
yatakātabūn(a) يَتَكَاتَبُونَ or يتكاتبون "they write to each other" (masculine)
istiktāb اِسْتِكْتابَ or استكتاب "causing to write"
kitāb كِتابٌ or كتاب "book" (the hyphen shows end of stem before various case endings)
kutayyib كُتَيِّبٌ or كتيب "booklet" (diminutive)
kitābah كِتابةٌ or كتابة "writing"
kuttāb كُتّابٌ or كتاب "writers" (broken plural)
katabah كَتَبةٌ or كتبة "clerks" (broken plural)
maktab مَكْتَبٌ or مكتب "desk" or "office"
maktabah مَكْتَبةٌ or مكتبة "library" or "bookshop"
maktūb مَكْتُوبٌ or مكتوب "written" (participle) or "postal letter" (noun)
katībah كَتِيبةٌ or كتيبة "squadron" or "document"
iktitāb اِكْتِتابٌ or اكتتاب "registration" or "contribution of funds"
muktatib مُكتَتِبٌ or مكتتب "subscription"

and the same root in Hebrew:
(A line under k and b mean a fricative, x for k and v for b.)

kāṯaḇti כָּתַבְתִּי or כתבתי "I wrote"
kattāḇ כַּתָּב or כתב "reporter" (m)
katteḇeṯ כַּתָּבֶת or כתבת "reporter" (f)
kattāḇā כַּתָּבָה or כתבה "article"
miḵtāḇ מִכְתָּב or מכתב "postal letter"
miḵtāḇā מִכְתָבָה or מכתבה "writing desk"
kəṯōḇeṯ כְּתֹבֶת or כתובת "address"
kəṯāḇ כְּתָב or כתב "handwriting"
kāṯūḇ כָּתוּב or כתוב "written"
hiḵtīḇ הִכְתִּיב or הכתיב "he dictated"
hiṯkattēḇ הִתְכַּתֵּב or התכתב "he corresponded
niḵtaḇ נִכְתָּב or נכתב "it was written" (m)
kəṯīḇ כְּתִיב or כתיב "spelling" (m)
taḵtīḇ תַּכְתִּיב or תכתיב "prescript" (m)
məḵuttāḇ מְכֻתָּב or מכותב "addressee"
kəṯubbā כְּתֻבָּה or כתובה "ketubah (a Jewish marriage contract)" (f)

In Tigrinya and Amharic, this root was used widely but is now seen as an archaic form. Ethiopic-derived languages use different roots for things that have to do with writing (and in some cases counting). The primitive root ṣ-f and the trilateral root stems m-ṣ-f, ṣ-h-f, and ṣ-f-r are used. This root also exists in other Semitic languages, such as Hebrew: sep̄er "book", sōp̄er "scribe", mispār "number" and sippūr "story". This root also exists in Arabic and is used to form words with a close meaning to "writing", such as ṣaḥāfa "journalism", and ṣaḥīfa "newspaper" or "parchment".
Verbs in other non-Semitic Afroasiatic languages show similar radical patterns, but more usually with biconsonantal roots; e.g. Kabyle afeg means "fly!", while affug means "flight", and yufeg means "he flew" (compare with Hebrew, where hap̄lēḡ means "set sail!", hap̄lāḡā means "a sailing trip", and hip̄līḡ means "he sailed", while the unrelated ʕūp̄, təʕūp̄ā and ʕāp̄ pertain to flight).

Independent personal pronouns

Cardinal numerals

These are the basic numeral stems without feminine suffixes. Note that in most older Semitic languages, the forms of the numerals from 3 to 10 exhibit polarity of gender (also called "chiastic concord" or "reverse agreement"), i.e. if the counted noun is masculine, the numeral would be feminine and vice versa.

Typology

Some early Semitic languages are speculated to have had weak ergative features.

Common vocabulary
Due to the Semitic languages' common origin, they share some words and roots. Others differ. For example:

Terms given in brackets are not derived from the respective Proto-Semitic roots, though they may also derive from Proto-Semitic (as does e.g. Arabic dār, cf. Biblical Hebrew dōr "dwelling").

Sometimes, certain roots differ in meaning from one Semitic language to another. For example, the root b-y-ḍ in Arabic has the meaning of "white" as well as "egg", whereas in Hebrew it only means "egg". The root l-b-n means "milk" in Arabic, but the color "white" in Hebrew. The root l-ḥ-m means "meat" in Arabic, but "bread" in Hebrew and "cow" in Ethiopian Semitic; the original meaning was most probably "food". The word medina (root: d-y-n/d-w-n) has the meaning of "metropolis" in Amharic, "city" in Arabic and Ancient Hebrew, and "State" in Modern Hebrew.

Of course, there is sometimes no relation between the roots. For example, "knowledge" is represented in Hebrew by the root y-d-ʿ, but in Arabic by the roots ʿ-r-f and ʿ-l-m and in Ethiosemitic by the roots ʿ-w-q and f-l-ṭ.

For more comparative vocabulary lists, see Wiktionary appendices:

 List of Proto-Semitic stems
 Swadesh lists for Afro-Asiatic languages

Classification
There are six fairly uncontroversial nodes within the Semitic languages: East Semitic, Northwest Semitic, North Arabian, Old South Arabian (also known as Sayhadic), Modern South Arabian, and Ethiopian Semitic. These are generally grouped further, but there is ongoing debate as to which belong together. The classification based on shared innovations given below, established by Robert Hetzron in 1976 and with later emendations by John Huehnergard and Rodgers as summarized in Hetzron 1997, is the most widely accepted today. In particular, several Semiticists still argue for the traditional (partially nonlinguistic) view of Arabic as part of South Semitic, and a few (e.g. Alexander Militarev or the German-Egyptian professor Arafa Hussein Mustafa,) see the South Arabian languages, as a third branch of Semitic alongside East and West Semitic, rather than as a subgroup of South Semitic. However, a new classification groups Old South Arabian as Central Semitic instead.

Roger Blench notes, that the Gurage languages are highly divergent and wonders whether they might not be a primary branch, reflecting an origin of Afroasiatic in or near Ethiopia. At a lower level, there is still no general agreement on where to draw the line between "languages" and "dialects" an issue particularly relevant in Arabic, Aramaic and Gurage and the strong mutual influences between Arabic dialects render a genetic subclassification of them particularly difficult.

A computational phylogenetic analysis by Kitchen et al. (2009), considers the Semitic languages to have originated in the Levant about 5,750 years ago during the Early Bronze Age, with early Ethiosemitic originating from southern Arabia approximately 2,800 years ago. Evidence for gene movements consistent with this were found in Almarri et al. (2021).

The Himyaritic and Sutean languages appear to have been Semitic, but are unclassified due to insufficient data.

 East Semitic (†)
 West Semitic
 Central Semitic
 Northwest Semitic
 Arabic
 South Semitic
 Western: Ethiopian Semitic and Old South Arabian
 Eastern: Modern South Arabian

Semitic-speaking peoples
The following is a list of some modern and ancient Semitic-speaking peoples and nations:

Central Semitic
 Ammonite speakers of Ammon
 Amorites 20th century BC
 Arabs
 Ancient North Arabian-speaking bedouins
 Arameans 16th to 8th centuries BC / Akhlames (Ahlamu) 14th century BC.
 Canaanite-speaking nations of the early Iron Age:
 Chaldea  appeared in southern Mesopotamia c. 1000 BC and eventually disappeared into the general Babylonian population.
 Edomites
 Hadhramis
 Hebrews/Israelites founded the nation of Israel which later split into the Kingdoms of Israel and Judah. The remnants of these people became the Jews and the Samaritans.
 Maltese
 Mandaeans
 Mhallami
 Moab
 Nabataeans
 Phoenicia founded Mediterranean colonies including Tyre, Sidon and ancient Carthage. The remnants of these people became the modern inhabitants of Lebanon.
 Ugarit, 14th to 12th centuries BC
 Nasrani (Syrian Christian)

East Semitic
 Akkadian Empire ancient Semitic speakers moved into Mesopotamia in the fourth millennium BC and settled among the local peoples of Sumer.
Babylonian Empire
Assyrian Empire/Assyrians
Ebla 23rd century BC

South Semitic
 Kingdom of Aksum 4th century BC to 7th century AD
 Amhara people
 Argobba people
 Dahalik people
 Gurage people
 Harari people
 Mehri people
 Old South Arabian-speaking peoples
 Sabaeans of Yemen 9th to 1st centuries BC
 Silt'e people
 Soqotri people
 Tigrigna People 
 Tigray people
 Tigre people
 Zay people

Unknown
 Suteans 14th century BC
 Thamud 2nd to 5th centuries AD

See also
 Proto-Semitic language
 Middle Bronze Age alphabets

Notes

References

Bibliography

 
 
 
 
 
 
 
 
 
 
 
 
 
 
 
 
 
 
 
 
 
 
 
 
 
 
 
 
 
 
 Mustafa, Arafa Hussein. 1974. Analytical study of phrases and sentences in epic texts of Ugarit. (German title: Untersuchungen zu Satztypen in den epischen Texten von Ugarit). Dissertation. Halle-Wittenberg: Martin-Luther-University.
 
 
 
 
 
 
 
 
 
  
 
 
 
 
  [2002 edition: ]

External links

 Semitic genealogical tree (as well as the Afroasiatic one), presented by Alexander Militarev at his talk "Genealogical classification of Afro-Asiatic languages according to the latest data" (at the conference on the 70th anniversary of Vladislav Illich-Svitych, Moscow, 2004; short annotations of the talks given there 
 Pattern-and-root inflectional morphology: the Arabic broken plural
 Ancient snake spell in Egyptian pyramid may be oldest Semitic inscription
  Alexis Neme and Sébastien Paumier (2019), Restoring Arabic vowels through omission-tolerant dictionary lookup, Lang Resources & Evaluation, Vol 53, 1–65 pages
 Swadesh vocabulary lists of Semitic languages (from Wiktionary's Swadesh-list appendix)

 
Afroasiatic languages
Aramaic languages
Arabic language
Hebrew language
Amharic language
Ge'ez language
Phoenician language
Akkadian language